Skalica – Zimna Arena is an arena in Skalica, Slovakia.  It is primarily used for ice hockey and is the home arena of HK 36 Skalica. It has a capacity of 4,100 people and was built in 1969.

Indoor ice hockey venues in Slovakia
Buildings and structures in Trnava Region